is a railway station in the city of Fuji, Shizuoka Prefecture, Japan, operated by the private railway operator Gakunan Railway.

Lines

Station layout
Yoshiwara-honchō Station has one side platform serving a single bi-directional track. The station is staffed.

Adjacent stations

Station history
Yoshiwara-honchō Station was opened on November 18, 1949.

Passenger statistics
In fiscal 2017, the station was used by an average of 1079 passengers daily (boarding passengers only).

Surrounding area
 Fuji City Hall

See also
 List of Railway Stations in Japan

References

External links

  

Railway stations in Shizuoka Prefecture
Railway stations in Japan opened in 1949
Fuji, Shizuoka